The National Exhibition of Fine Arts (Spanish: Exposiciones Nacionales de Bellas Artes) was a regular event that took place in Spain from 1856 to 1968; usually in Madrid. These exhibitions were in the form of a competition, established by a Royal Decree from Queen Isabella II in 1853. It was the largest official exhibition of Spanish art.

It was initially divided into five categories: Painting, Sculpture, Engraving, Architecture, and Decorative Arts. Painting was always considered the most prestigious category, however, and Decorative Arts was only occasional. Although the decree specified that they were to be held biennially, this was not always strictly observed.

Origins and proposals 
The process began when it was noted by many critics that Spain was underrepresented in most international exhibitions. There were also widespread feelings that Spanish art had become decadent since the old patronage system, supported by the Catholic church and the aristocracy, had disappeared; due in large part to the continuing Confiscation. Then, in 1851, the Parisian cultural journal, L'Illustration, ran an article on the International Exposition of Fine Arts in Brussels with the headline, "L'Espagne n'existe plus!" (Spain no longer exists).

At that time, the recognized model for art exhibitions was the Paris Salon, with its regulations, juries, formal critiques, public exposure, established hierarchies of prize categories and opportunities for acquisition. In a proposal sent to the Congress of Deputies by the painter, José Galofré y Coma, the need for establishing such an exhibition was strongly argued. After the questions of organization and funding had been settled, it was presented to the Royal Family for final approval.

The exhibition was maintained in largely the same form until the 1920s, although the frequency became erratic; sometimes every two years, sometimes every three. There were also longer intervals due to political and social disruptions; notably the Spanish Civil War.

The original concepts and criteria slowly became obsolete, and the last exhibition was held in 1968.

Prizes and winners 

The prizes awarded were "First Class", "Second Class", "Third Class" and "Honorable Mention". In the painting category, anywhere from 300 to 500 works might be entered. The other categories rarely exceeded 10% of that.

Winners of the First Class medal in the Painting category
 1856:
 Eduardo Cano, Christopher Columbus in the Convent of La Rábida
 Luis de Madrazo, Don Pelayo in Covadonga
 1858:
 Eduardo Cano, The Burial of the Constable, Don Álvaro de Luna
 Antonio Gisbert, The Last Moments of Prince Don Carlos 
 Carlos de Haes, View of the Surroundings of the Monasterio de Piedra
 1860:
 Antonio Gisbert, The Comuneros, Padilla, Bravo and Maldonado on the Scaffold
 José Casado del Alisal, The Last Moments of Fernando IV, the Summoned
 Carlos de Haes, A Landscape: Memories of Andalucía
 Dionisio Fierros, A Pilgrimage in the Neighborhoods of Santiago
 Pablo Gonzalvo, View of the Transept of the Cathedral of Toledo
 1862:
 Alejo Vera, The Burial of San Lorenzo
 Dióscoro Puebla, The First Landing of Christopher Columbus in America
 Germán Hernández Amores, Journey of the Virgin and Saint John to Ephesus
 Vicente Palmaroli, A Peasant Girl from Naples Named Pascuccia
 Ignacio Suárez Llanos, Sister Marcela of San Félix, Watching the Funeral of her Father, Lope de Vega, Pass By
 Carlos de Haes, Landscape in Losoya
 Pablo Gonzalvo, Chapel of the Constable in the Cathedral of Toledo
 1864:
 Eduardo Rosales, Isabella the Catholic Dictating her Will and Testament
 Antonio Gisbert, The Landing of the Puritans in North America
 José Casado del Alisal, The Surrender of Bailén
 Pablo Gonzalvo, The Interior of the Courtyards of the Kingdom of Valencia
 1867:
 Benet Mercadé, The Ascension of Saint Francis of Assisi
 Vicente Palmaroli, Sermon in the Cistine Chapel
 Alejo Vera, A Chorus of Monkeys
 Dióscoro Puebla, The Compromise of Caspe
 1871:
 Eduardo Rosales, The Death of Lucretia
 Manuel Domínguez Sánchez, The Death of Seneca
 Francisco Domingo Marqués, Santa Clara Vicente Palmaroli, The Fusillades of May Third on the Hill of Príncipe Pío
 Alejo Vera, A Pompeian Lady in her Boudoir
 1876: No First Class prizes were awarded this year.
 1878: Alejandro Ferrant, The Burial of Saint Sebastian 
 Emilio Sala, Guillén de Vinatea, before Alonso IV, demanding that he Revoke the Partition of Valencia
 Casto Plasencia, Origin of the Roman Republic
 Salvador Martínez Cubells, The Education of Prince Don Juan
 1881: Antonio Muñoz Degrain, Othello and Desdemona
 Emilio Sala, Novus Ortus, an Allegory of the Renaissance
 José Moreno Carbonero, Prince Don Carlos of Viana
 1884: Juan Luna, Spoliarium
 Antonio Muñoz Degrain, The Lovers of Teruel
 José Moreno Carbonero, The Conversion of the Duke of Gandía
 1887: Ricardo Villodas y de la Torre, Victoribus Gloria
 Ulpiano Checa, The Invasion of the Barbarians
 Francisco Javier Amérigo, The Sack of Rome
 José Benlliure, The Vision of the Colosseum
 Salvador Viniegra, The Blessing of the Field in 1800
 Salvador Martínez Cubells, Doña Inés de Castro
 1890: Luis Álvarez Catalá, The Seat of Felipe II in the Escorial
 José Jiménez Aranda, A Misfortune
 Justo Ruiz Luna, Naval Combat at Trafalgar
 1892: Francisco Javier Amérigo, The Right of Asylum
 Vicente Cutanda, A Workers' Strike in Vizcaya
 Alejandro Ferrant, Cisneros, Founder of the Hospital of Illescas
 José Garnelo, Cornelia
 Luis Jiménez Aranda, A Hospital Room During the Doctor's Visit
 Luis Menéndez Pidal, The Empty Cradle
 José Nogales Sevilla, Santa Casilda
 Enrique Simonet, Flevit Super Illam
 Joaquín Sorolla, Another Marguerite!
 Jaime Morera y Galicia, The Coast of Normandy
 1895: Joaquín Sorolla, And They Still Say That Fish is Expemsive!
 Alberto Pla y Rubio, To the War!
 Modest Urgell, El Pedregal, a Civilized Village
 1897: Ignacio Pinazo Camarlench, Portrait of Don José María Mellado
 Sebastián Gessa y Arias, Flowers and Fruits
 1899: Luis Menéndez Pidal, Salus Infirmorum
 Ignacio Pinazo Camarlench, The Memory Lesson
 Gonzalo Bilbao, Sea of the Levant
 1901: Gonzalo Bilbao, for an ensemble of related works
 , The Prisoners' Rope
 1904: Eduardo Chicharro y Agüera, The Poem of Armida and Rinaldo
 Ramon Casas, The Charge
 Enrique Martínez Cubells, Work, Rest and Family
 Manuel Benedito, Canto VII of Dante's Inferno
 1906: Fernando Álvarez de Sotomayor, The Grandparents
 Manuel Benedito, Mother
 Fernando Cabrera Cantó, To the Abyss...
 Eliseo Meifrén y Roig, Prayers, Pontevedra
 1908: Eduardo Chicharro y Agüera, The Three Wives
 José María Rodríguez-Acosta, The Gypsies of Sacromonte
 Julio Romero de Torres, The Gypsy Muse
 Santiago Rusiñol, The Garden of Aranjuez
 1910: José María López Mezquita, Portrait of the Mr."B"s and Children
 Carlos Vázquez Úbeda, The Wounded Torero
 Marceliano Santa María Sedano, Angelica and Medoro
 Manuel Ramírez Ibáñez, Before the Class
 1912: Enrique Martínez Cubells, Return from the Catch
 , The Procession of the Corpus in Lezo
 Santiago Rusiñol, The Old Faun
 José María Rodríguez-Acosta, for an ensemble of related works
 1915: José Ramón Zaragoza, Portrait of Mr. Th. S.
 Enrique Galwey, Nightfall in the Pine Grove
 José Pinazo Martínez, Floreal
 Ventura Álvarez Sala, Our Daily Bread
 1917: Joaquim Mir, The Waters of Moguda
 Eugenio Hermoso, At the Village Fiesta
 , Versolaris
 1920: Julio Moisés Fernández (1888-1968), Portrait
 Álvaro Alcalá Galiano y Vildósola, The Path
 1922: Francisco Llorens Díaz, Rías Baixas
 , Portrait
 José Gutiérrez Solana, The Return from Fishing
 1924: Antonio Ortiz Echagüe, Jacob van Amstel at My House
 Ramón de Zubiaurre, The Basque Sailor, Shanti-Andia the Fearless
 , The Snows of El Cirbunal
 1926: José Bermejo Sobera (1879-c.1953), The Coffee Shop
 José Cruz Herrera, The Harvest Offering
 Aurelio García Lesmes, The Fields of Zaratán
 1929: Joaquín Mir, Landscape
 Santiago Rusiñol, Almond Trees in Bloom
 José Gutiérrez Solana, The Showgirls
 José Aguiar, Women of the South
 Francisco Soria Aedo, Christmas Eve in the Village
 1930: , Borgia
 1932: Aurelio Arteta, The Men of the Sea
 , Yesterday
 , Landscape of Normandy
 1936: The exhibition could not be completed, due to the outbreak of the Spanish Civil War.
 1941: , The School of Hard Knocks
 , The Valley of Liébana
 José Suárez Peregrín (1908-?), On the Road to Emmaus
 1943: Juan Luis López (1894-1984), Women Sailors
 Luis Muntané (1899-1987), Naked
 Benjamín Palencia, Toledo
 , Nature
 1945: , Dressing Room
 Mariano Sancho (1895-1977), Portraits
 Luis Mosquera Gómez (1899-1987), Fancy Dress
 , The Visit
 , Adam and Eve
 1948:'''
 , Portrait of the Author, Azorín Adelardo Covarsí, The Hunter of Alpotreque , The Lesson of the SixAfter that time, the exhibitions became more sporadic and perfunctory, and information regarding the results is not readily available.

References

 Further reading 
 Bernardino de Pantorba, Historia y crítica de las Exposiciones Nacionales de Bellas Artes celebradas en España, Alcor 1980  Online
 Un siglo de arte español: (1856-1956), Ministerio de Educación Nacional, Dirección General de Bellas Artes, 1955
 Gregorio Cruzada Villaamil, Juicio crítico de la Exposición de Bellas Artes de 1867''

External links 
 Fiche des Expositions nationales des beaux arts @ Artehistoria
 Los Pintores Extremeños en las Exposiciones Nacionales de Bellas Artes (1924-1936)

Recurring events established in 1853
Recurring events disestablished in 1968
Art exhibitions in Spain
Spanish culture